Lautaro Núñez Atencio, (Iquique 24 January 1936) is a Chilean historian winner of the Chilean National History Award in 2002.

Bibliography
La Tirana del Tamarugal : del misterio al sacramento, 1989
Cultura y conflicto en los oasis de San Pedro de Atacama, 1992
Gustavo Le Paige S.J. : cronología de una misión, 1993
Reseña bibliográfica: El Dios Cautivo. Las Ligas Patrióticas en la chilenización compulsiva de Tarapacá (1910-1922), (2005)

References

20th-century Chilean historians
20th-century Chilean male writers
21st-century Chilean historians
21st-century Chilean male writers
1938 births
Living people
People from Iquique
Chilean archaeologists